Dionne Warwick is an American singer. She has charted 69 times on the US Billboard Hot 100 singles chart, making her the second-most charted female  vocalist during the rock era (1955–1999), after Aretha Franklin. Warwick has sold over 100 million records (over 75 million singles and 25 million albums) worldwide. She has charted 18 songs in the Top 20 of the US Hot 100 and charted several more hits inside the Top 40.

Dionne Warwick reached the number one spot twice on the Billboard Hot 100, both times for collaborations.  "Then Came You" with The Spinners hit number one in 1974 and "That's What Friends Are For" with Elton John, Gladys Knight, and Stevie Wonder earned the top spot in 1986.

Albums

Studio albums

Live albums

Compilation albums

Singles

1960s

1970s

1980s

1990s–2020s

Other singles

Other appearances

Notes

References

Notes

External links

Discography
Discographies of American artists
Pop music discographies
Rhythm and blues discographies
Soul music discographies